Mount Wisting is a rock peak (2,580 m), the northwesternmost summit of the massif at the head of Amundsen Glacier in the Queen Maud Mountains. In November 1911, a number of mountain peaks in this general vicinity were observed and positioned by the South Pole Party under Roald Amundsen. Amundsen named one of them for Oscar Wisting, a member of the party. The peak described was mapped by United States Geological Survey (USGS) from surveys and U.S. Navy aerial photography, 1960–64. For the sake of historical continuity and to commemorate the Norwegian exploration in this area, the Advisory Committee on Antarctic Names (US-ACAN) has selected this feature to be designated Mount Wisting. Other peaks in the massif have been named for members of Amundsen's South Pole Party.

Mountains of the Ross Dependency
Amundsen Coast